The following is a list of Major League Baseball players, retired or active. As of the end of the 2011 season, there have been 864 players with a last name that begins with D who have been on a major league roster at some point.

D
Omar Daal
John D'Acquisto
Paul Dade
John Dagenhard
Bill Dahlen
Con Daily
Hugh Daily
Bruce Dal Canton
Pete Dalena
Mark Dalesandro
Bill Daley
Bud Daley
Pete Daley
Dom Dallessandro
Sun Daly
Tom Daly (C)
Tom Daly (IF)
Jeff C. D'Amico
Jeff M. D'Amico
Johnny Damon
Chuck Daniel
Bert Daniels
Charlie Daniels
Jack Daniels
Kal Daniels
Law Daniels
John Danks
Harry Danning
Jamie D'Antona
Fats Dantonio
Cliff Dapper
Alvin Dark
Dell Darling
Ron Darling
Mike Darr (OF)
Mike Darr (P)
Bobby Darwin
Danny Darwin
Jeff Darwin
Jeff Datz
Brian Daubach
Jake Daubert
Jack Daugherty
Bob Daughters
Darren Daulton
Hooks Dauss
Yo-Yo Davalillo
Vic Davalillo
Jeff DaVanon
Jerry DaVanon
Claude Davenport
Jim Davenport
Lum Davenport
Mike Davey
Bob Davidson
Cleatus Davidson
Dave Davidson
Mark Davidson
Ted Davidson
Kyle Davies
Alvin Davis
Bob Davis (P)
Bob Davis (C)
Bud Davis
Butch Davis
Chili Davis
Curt Davis
Daisy Davis
Dick Davis
Doug Davis (IF)
Doug Davis (P)
Eric Davis
George Davis (SS) β
George Davis (P)
Gerry Davis
Glenn Davis
Harry Davis (1895–1917)
Harry Davis (1932–1937)
Ike Davis (SS)
Ike Davis (1B)
Jim Davis
Jody Davis
Jumbo Davis
Mark Davis (P)
Mark Davis (OF)
Mike Davis
Rajai Davis
Ron Davis (OF)
Ron Davis (P)
Russ Davis
Tim Davis
Tod Davis
Tommy Davis
Willie Davis
Wade Davis (pitcher)
Scott Davison
Bill Dawley
Joey Dawley
Andre Dawson β
Joe Dawson
Dewon Day
Zach Day
Brian Dayett
Ken Dayley
Roger Deago
Shorty Dee
Alejandro De Aza
Jordan De Jong
Eulogio de la Cruz
Tommy de la Cruz
Mike de la Hoz
Roland de la Maza
Jorge de la Rosa
Luis de los Santos (1B)
Luis de los Santos (P)
Ramón de los Santos
Cot Deal
Snake Deal
Pat Dealy
Dizzy Dean β
Dory Dean
Paul Dean
Harry Deane
Dennis DeBarr
Dave DeBusschere
Doug DeCinces
George Decker
Steve Decker
Rod Dedeaux
John Deering
Tony DeFate
Arturo DeFreites
Mike DeGerick
Herman Dehlman
Jim Deidel
Pep Deininger
Mike DeJean
David DeJesus
Iván DeJesús
José DeJesús
Francisco de la Rosa
Bobby Del Greco
Garton del Savio
Miguel del Toro
Ed Delahanty β
Frank Delahanty
Jim Delahanty
Joe Delahanty
Tom Delahanty
Manny Delcarmen
José DeLeón
Luis DeLeón
Carlos Delgado
Puchy Delgado
Wilson Delgado
David Dellucci
Bert Delmas
Joe DeMaestri
Al Demaree
Frank Demaree
Chris Demaria
Billy DeMars
Larry Demery
Don Demeter
Gene DeMontreville
Rick Dempsey
Brian Denman
Kyle Denney
Don Dennis
Jerry Denny
John Denny
Bucky Dent
Sam Dente
Jorge DePaula
Julio DePaula
Mark DeRosa
Mike Derrick
Gene Desautels
Jim Deshaies
Delino DeShields
Jimmie DeShong
Ian Desmond
Elmer Dessens
Bob Detherage
Tom Dettore
Ducky Detweiler
Mel Deutsch
Adrian Devine
Joey Devine
Mickey Devine
Hal Deviney
Doug DeVore
Josh Devore
Al DeVormer
Mark Dewey
Jeff DeWillis
Alex Diaz
Bo Díaz
Carlos Diaz (C)
Carlos Diaz (P)
Edgar Díaz
Edwin Díaz
Einar Díaz
Joselo Díaz
Juan Díaz (first baseman)
Juan Díaz (shortstop)
Matt Diaz
Mike Diaz
Víctor Díaz
Buttercup Dickerson
Bill Dickey β
George Dickey
Emerson Dickman
Murry Dickson
Lance Dickson
Walt Dickson
Bob Didier
Chuck Diering
Dick Dietz
Dutch Dietz
Mike DiFelice
Steve Dignan
Gordon Dillard
Steve Dillard
Bob Dillinger
Packy Dillon
Dom DiMaggio
Joe DiMaggio β
Vince DiMaggio
Kerry Dineen
Craig Dingman
Bill Dinneen
Ron Diorio
Bob DiPietro
Art Ditmar
Ken Dixon
Tom Dixon
Greg Dobbs
Ray Dobens
Joe Dobson
Pat Dobson
Larry Doby β
George Dockins
Sam Dodge
Pat Dodson
Fred Doe
Bobby Doerr β
John Doherty (1B)
John Doherty (P)
Scott Dohmann
Cozy Dolan (RF)
Cozy Dolan (LF)
John Dolan
Lester Dole
Andy Dominique
Deacon Donahue
Jim Donahue
John Donahue
Red Donahue
Tim Donahue
Atley Donald
John Donaldson
Josh Donaldson
Augie Donatelli
Mike Donlin
James Donnelly
Jim Donnelly
Pete Donnelly
Chris Donnels
Pete Donohue
Tom Donohue
Bill Donovan (1898–1918 P)
Bill Donovan (1942–43 P)
Dick Donovan
Jerry Donovan
Mike Donovan
Patsy Donovan
Tom Donovan
Bill Doran
Tom Doran
Jerry Dorgan
Mike Dorgan
Bert Dorr
Jim Dorsey
Herm Doscher
Jack Doscher
Richard Dotson
Jim Dougherty
Klondike Douglass
Ryan Doumit
Dennis Dove
John Dowd
Tommy Dowd
Tom Dowse
Brian Doyle
Carl Doyle
Danny Doyle
Denny Doyle
Jack Doyle
Jacob Doyle
Jeff Doyle
Jess Doyle
Jim Doyle
Larry Doyle
Paul Doyle
Slow Joe Doyle
D. J. Dozier
Doug Drabek
Moe Drabowsky
Dick Drago
Brian Drahman
Logan Drake
Mike Draper
Dave Dravecky
Tom Drees
Darren Dreifort
Clem Dreisewerd
Bill Drescher
Ryan Drese
Chuck Dressen
Kirk Dressendorfer
Rob Dressler
Cameron Drew
J. D. Drew
Tim Drew
Frank Drews
Karl Drews
Dan Driessen
Denny Driscoll
Jim Driscoll
Travis Driskill
Walt Dropo
Dick Drott
Keith Drumright
Don Drysdale β
Rob Ducey
Justin Duchscherer
Brandon Duckworth
John Dudra
Charlie Duffee
Chris Duffy
Danny Duffy
Frank Duffy
Hugh Duffy β
Joe Dugan
Gus Dugas
Oscar Dugey
Jim Duggan
Bill Duggleby
Zach Duke
Elijah Dukes
Jan Dukes
Bob Duliba
George Dumont
Dan Dumoulin
Nick Dumovich
Tom Dunbar
Chris Duncan
Courtney Duncan
Dave Duncan
Jeff Duncan
Mariano Duncan
Pat Duncan
Shelley Duncan
Vern Duncan
Ed Dundon
Davey Dunkle
Bill Dunlap
Fred Dunlap
Grant Dunlap
Adam Dunn
Jack Dunn
Scott Dunn
Steve Dunn (1884)
Steve Dunn (1990s)
Todd Dunn
Mike Dunne
Shawon Dunston
Dan Duran
Chad Durbin
Ryne Duren
Ed Durham
Leon Durham
Ray Durham
Bobby Durnbaugh
Leo Durocher β
Red Durrett
Cedric Durst
Jesse Duryea
Bill Duzen
Mike Duvall
Frank Dwyer
Jim Dwyer
Jerry Dybzinski
Jim Dyck
Jermaine Dye
Ben Dyer
Duffy Dyer
Mike Dyer
Jimmy Dykes
Lenny Dykstra

References
Last Names starting with D - Baseball-Reference.com

 D